Hans Baumann (1906 – 7 February 1971), was a Swiss architect and sports administrator who was one of the founding members of the International Handball Federation. He served as the second President of the International Handball Federation (IHF) from 1950 to 1971.

Biography
Born in Basel, Baumann is architect by profession. He was elected as IHF President in the 3rd IHF Congress held in Vienna (Austria) on 9 September 1950 and succeeded Gösta Björk (Sweden). Then onwards, he was continuously elected unopposed as IHF President until his death. He also served as the vice-president of IHF from 1946 to 1950 along with Charles Petit-Montgobert (France) under the presidency of Gösta Björk (Sweden). He was also a member of management committee of Swiss Handball Association since 1939.

Baumann's main aim was to see handball again on the Olympic Programme which he also completed but not able to witness it himself. He died due to heart attack in Basel (Switzerland) on 7 February 1971, one year and a half before the Olympic Handball Tournament in Munich.

After his death and seeing his great contribution to the development of handball worldwide, the IHF Council and Royal Spanish Handball Federation together created an award named Hans Baumann Trophy which would be awarded biannually during IHF Congress to the member federations for their outstanding contribution to the development of Handball in their country or through world. In 2016, the award was re-established and renamed by IHF Council as IHF President's Development Award.

References

Presidents of international sport federations
Swiss referees and umpires
Handball in Switzerland
1906 births
1971 deaths